Lars Hegaard  (born 1950) is a Danish composer and guitarist.

See also
List of Danish composers

References

Danish film score composers
1950 births
Living people
Place of birth missing (living people)
Danish guitarists
Date of birth missing (living people)
Male composers
20th-century Danish composers
Danish male musicians